Sir Harry Herbert Trusted  (27 June 1888 – 8 December 1985) was a British colonial Attorney-General and Chief Justice.

Education
Trusted was educated at Ellesmere College and Trinity Hall, Cambridge. He studied law at the Inner Temple, but joined the Middle Temple on 31 January 1911, withdrawing Middle Temple in 1913.

Career
Trusted was called to the bar in 1911 at Inner Temple and served overseas in the Duke of Cornwall's Light Infantry during the First World War (1914–1918).

In 1925 he was appointed a Puisne Judge in the Leeward Islands Supreme Court, becoming Attorney-General in 1927. In 1929 he was transferred to be Attorney-General of Cyprus.

From 1932 to 1936 he served as Attorney-General of the British Mandate for Palestine, then replaced Michael McDonnell as Chief Justice in 1936. As Chief Justice he is remembered for granting additional powers to the Bedouin Tribal Courts on condition they abandoned the practice of ordeal by fire (Bish'a). 

In 1941 he moved to be Chief Justice of the Federated Malay States, which lasted until 1946. For much of that time he was a Prisoner of War of the invading Japanese army.

In 1948 he chaired a Commission of Inquiry into the anti-Jewish riots in the British Protectorate of Aden.

Personal life
Trusted was born in Birmingham, the only son of the Rev. Wilson Trusted of Salisbury in 1888.

He had married Mary Warmington, daughter of Sir Marshall Warmington, 1st Baronet. They had 2 sons and 3 daughters. His son John Marshall Trusted died at 21.

He died in Surrey in 1985.

Honour
Trusted was knighted in 1938.

References

1888 births
1985 deaths
People from Birmingham, West Midlands
People educated at Ellesmere College
Alumni of Trinity Hall, Cambridge
Members of the Inner Temple
British Cyprus people
Attorneys General of the Leeward Islands
Chief justices
20th-century King's Counsel
Knights Bachelor
Mandatory Palestine judges
Federated Malay States judges
British Leeward Islands judges
British World War II prisoners of war
World War II civilian prisoners held by Japan
Attorneys-General of British Cyprus
Attorneys-General of Mandatory Palestine
British Army personnel of World War I
Duke of Cornwall's Light Infantry officers